Charles Whitcombe may refer to:

Charles Douglas Whitcombe (1835–1904), New Zealand public official and diplomat
Charles Arthur Ford Whitcombe (1872–1930), English architect; immigrated to Australia in 1916
Charles Whitcombe (golfer) (1895–1978), English professional golfer